The National Printing Office of Colombia is an agency of the executive branch of the Government of Colombia. The Office prints the Diario Oficial, the official journal that publishes documents produced by and for the central government, including the Supreme Court, the Congress, the Executive Office of the President, Executive Ministries, and ascribed agencies and corporations.

References

Printing
Government agencies established in 1894
Ministry of the Interior (Colombia)